Kalle Ahti Soini (13 February 1884 – 24 May 1946) was a Finnish agronomist and politician, born in Mouhijärvi. He was a Member of the Parliament of Finland from 1933 to 1945, representing the National Coalition Party.

References

1884 births
1946 deaths
People from Sastamala
People from Turku and Pori Province (Grand Duchy of Finland)
National Coalition Party politicians
Members of the Parliament of Finland (1933–36)
Members of the Parliament of Finland (1936–39)
Members of the Parliament of Finland (1939–45)
Finnish people of World War II
University of Helsinki alumni